Bethel Historic District, also known as Lewisville and Lewis' Wharf, is a national historic district located at Bethel, Sussex County, Delaware.  The district includes four contributing buildings. They are representative of dwellings built by the village's skilled ship carpenters.  They are the two Ship-Carpenter Houses, the Moore House, and 4 R's Farm house. The two Ship-Carpenter Houses were built before 1868, and each consists of a low, -story section with an adjoining rear wing and a taller -story addition.  The Moore House is a -story dwelling with a -story addition and kitchen wing.  It features a Victorian cross-gable roof adorned with gingerbread trim. The "4 R's Farm" house is a square, two-story, three bay dwelling in the Italianate style.

It was added to the National Register of Historic Places in 1975.

References

External links 
 Ship-Carpenter's House, Main Street, Bethel, Sussex County, DE: 5 photos and 2 data pages at Historic American Buildings Survey
 Ship Carpenter's House, Main Street, Bethel, Sussex County, DE: 3 photos and 3 data pages at Historic American Buildings Survey

Houses on the National Register of Historic Places in Delaware
Historic districts in Sussex County, Delaware
Italianate architecture in Delaware
Houses in Sussex County, Delaware
Historic districts on the National Register of Historic Places in Delaware
National Register of Historic Places in Sussex County, Delaware